The 2009 Canadian Soccer League season was the 12th since its establishment where a total of 17 teams from Ontario and Quebec took part in the league. The season began on May 15, 2008, and ended on October 24 where for the second straight season the Serbian White Eagles faced Trois-Rivières Attak at the CSL Championship. The Attak denied Serbia their championship title by defeating them 3-2 in a penalty shootout. The victory marked the organizations first championship title, and the return of the championship to Quebec since the 1978 season when Montreal Castors competed in the National Soccer League. Throughout the regular season both Serbia, and Trois-Rivieres won their respective divisions.

The season marked a historic year for the league as it became the first league in 16 years to receive conditional membership in the Canadian Soccer Association. Allowing the CSL to create an effective player developmental system in order to provide the missing link between the top provincial amateur level to the MLS/USL. The league received more coverage with Rogers TV committing to broadcasting a full 23-game schedule every Saturday night through to the finals. While the Reserve Division expanded to include 7 teams with TFC Academy II winning their first piece of silverware.

Changes from 2008 season
  League extends playoffs to two games series and reduces regular-season schedule from 22 to 18 and a balanced schedule.
  Top 8 teams qualify for playoffs, without any seeding for division winners.
  CSL receives conditional membership in the Canadian Soccer Association (first league to achieve this in 16 years).
  Rogers TV commits to broadcasting a full 23-game schedule every Saturday night through to the finals.
  Inaria comes on board as official ball, and referee apparel sponsor.
  Windsor Border Stars franchise revoked.

Teams

Results table
All Stats Current as of games played Sep 20, 2009.

Standings

International Division

National Division

Playoffs
In 2009, both the quarterfinals and semifinals will be two game series. The winner of the series will be the team with the most points after two games.  Should they be tied after the second game, the 2nd game will go into overtime, and if necessary, penalty kicks.

In both the quarter- and semifinals, the team who finished higher in the standings determines which of the two games they prefer to host.

The Championship shall be a one-game final on Saturday October 24 at Lamport Stadium in Toronto.

Bracket

Quarterfinals

Semifinals

CSL Championship

Goal scorers

Updated: November 25, 2016
Source: https://web.archive.org/web/20090917202856/http://www.canadiansoccerleague.ca/league_leaders_CSL.php?league_id=4346

CSL Executive Committee and Staff 
A list of the 2009 CSL Executive Committee.

Individual awards 

The annual CSL awards were presented before the CSL Championship final on October 24, 2009. The majority of the awards were taken by the National Division teams. The Serbian White Eagles and Trois-Rivières Attak went home with the most awards. Serbian team captain Sasa Viciknez became the second player in CSL history to be named the MVP twice. After recording one of the best defensive records throughout the season Dan Pelc took the Goalkeeper of the Year. Mirko Medic a former Serbian football veteran also contributed to Serbia's strong defensive performance, and as a result was voted the Defender of the Year.

Reda Agourram of Trois-Rivières received both the Golden Boot and Rookie of the Year honors, which subsequently promoted him to the USL First Division with the Montreal Impact. After leading Trois-Rivières to their first double Philippe Eullaffroy was given the Coach of the Year. Armand Di Fruscio the veteran general manager of St. Catharines Wolves was presented with the Harry Paul Gauss award for his constant commitment and allegiance to the league. TFC Academy were given their first Fair Play and Respect award. The Referee of the Year went to Justin Tasev, a veteran match official who refereed numerous USL and NASL matches.

Reserve Division   

The 2009 season saw the division increase to 7 teams with all the matches being played St. Joan Of Arc Turf Field in Vaughan, Ontario. The division was still primary based in the Greater Toronto Area with the senior clubs establishing relationships with the top provincial youth clubs in order to compete in the reserve division to provide a player development structure.

Final standings

Final

References

Canadian Soccer League (1998–present) seasons
Canadian Soccer League
Canadian Soccer League